Jimmy Deandre Deshon Williams (born May 25, 1986) is an American-born Togolese professional basketball player. He currently plays for Abidjan Azur.

Professional career
In May 2021, Williams signed with Abidjan Azur in Ivory Coast.

National team career
Williams represented Togo’s national basketball team at the AfroBasket 2011 in Antananarivo, Madagascar, where he was Togo’s top scorer.

References

External links
 Afrobasket.com profile
 REAL GM profile

1986 births
Living people
Alderson Broaddus Battlers men's basketball players
Guards (basketball)
Togolese men's basketball players
Togolese expatriates in Morocco
Togolese people of American descent
21st-century Togolese people